David Brooks (born August 11, 1961) is a conservative political and cultural commentator who writes for The New York Times. He has worked as a film critic for The Washington Times, a reporter and later op-ed editor for The Wall Street Journal, a senior editor at The Weekly Standard from its inception, a contributing editor at Newsweek, and The Atlantic Monthly, in addition to working as a commentator on NPR and the PBS NewsHour.

Early life and education
Brooks was born in Toronto, Ontario, where his father was working on a PhD at the University of Toronto. He spent his early years in the Stuyvesant Town housing development in New York City with his brother, Daniel. His father taught English literature at New York University, while his mother studied nineteenth-century British history at Columbia University. Brooks was raised Jewish but rarely attended synagogue in his later adult life. As a young child, Brooks attended the Grace Church School, an independent Episcopal primary school in the East Village. When he was 12, his family moved to the Philadelphia Main Line, the affluent suburbs of Philadelphia. He graduated from Radnor High School in 1979. In 1983, Brooks graduated from the University of Chicago with a degree in history. His senior thesis was on popular science writer Robert Ardrey.

As an undergraduate, Brooks frequently contributed reviews and satirical pieces to campus publications. His senior year, he wrote a spoof of the lifestyle of wealthy conservative William F. Buckley Jr., who was scheduled to speak at the university: "In the afternoons he is in the habit of going into crowded rooms and making everybody else feel inferior. The evenings are reserved for extended bouts of name-dropping." To his piece, Brooks appended the note: "Some would say I'm envious of Mr. Buckley. But if truth be known, I just want a job and have a peculiar way of asking. So how about it, Billy? Can you spare a dime?" When Buckley arrived to give his talk, he asked whether Brooks was in the lecture audience and offered him a job.

Early career
Upon graduation, Brooks became a police reporter for the City News Bureau of Chicago, a wire service owned jointly by the Chicago Tribune and Chicago Sun Times. He says that his experience on Chicago's crime beat had a conservatizing influence on him. In 1984, mindful of the offer he had received from Buckley, Brooks applied and was accepted as an intern at Buckley's National Review. According to Christopher Beam, the internship included an all-access pass to the affluent lifestyle that Brooks had previously mocked, including yachting expeditions, Bach concerts, dinners at Buckley's Park Avenue apartment and villa in Stamford, Connecticut, and a constant stream of writers, politicians, and celebrities.

Brooks was an outsider in more ways than his relative inexperience. National Review was a Catholic magazine, and Brooks is not Catholic. Sam Tanenhaus later reported in The New Republic that Buckley might have eventually named Brooks his successor if it hadn't been for his being Jewish. "If true, it would be upsetting," Brooks says.

After his internship with Buckley ended, Brooks spent some time at the conservative Hoover Institution at Stanford University and wrote movie reviews for The Washington Times.

Career

In 1986, Brooks was hired by The Wall Street Journal, where he worked first as an editor of the book review section. He also filled in for five months as a movie critic. From 1990 to 1994, the newspaper posted Brooks as an op-ed columnist to Brussels, where he covered Russia (making numerous trips to Moscow); the Middle East; South Africa; and European affairs. On his return, Brooks joined the neo-conservative Weekly Standard when it was launched in 1994. Two years later, he edited an anthology, Backward and Upward: The New Conservative Writing.

In 2000, Brooks published a book of cultural commentary titled Bobos in Paradise: The New Upper Class and How They Got There to considerable acclaim. The book, a paean to consumerism, argued that the new managerial or "new upper class" represents a marriage between the liberal idealism of the 1960s and the self-interest of the 1980s.

According to a 2010 article in New York Magazine written by Christopher Beam, New York Times editorial-page editor Gail Collins called Brooks in 2003 and invited him to lunch.

Collins was looking for a conservative to replace outgoing columnist William Safire, but one who understood how liberals think. "I was looking for the kind of conservative writer that wouldn't make our readers shriek and throw the paper out the window," says Collins. "He was perfect." Brooks started writing in September 2003. "The first six months were miserable," Brooks says. "I'd never been hated on a mass scale before."

In 2004, Brooks' book On Paradise Drive: How We Live Now (And Always Have) in the Future Tense was published as a sequel to his 2000 best seller, Bobos in Paradise, but it was not as well received as its predecessor. Brooks is also the volume editor of The Best American Essays (publication date October 2, 2012), and authored The Social Animal: The Hidden Sources of Love, Character and Achievement. The book was excerpted in The New Yorker in January 2011 and received mixed reviews upon its full publication in March of that year. It sold well and reached #3 on the Publishers Weekly best-sellers list for non-fiction in April 2011.

Brooks was a visiting professor of public policy at Duke University's Terry Sanford Institute of Public Policy, and taught an undergraduate seminar there in the fall of 2006. In 2013, he taught a course at Yale University on philosophical humility.

In 2012, Brooks was elected to the University of Chicago Board of Trustees. He also serves on the board of advisors for the University of Chicago Institute of Politics.

In 2019, Brooks gave a TED talk in Vancouver entitled 'The Lies Our Culture Tells Us About What Matters – And a Better Way to Live'. TED curator Chris Anderson selected it as one of his favourite talks of 2019.

Political views

Ideologically, Brooks has been described as a moderate, a centrist, a conservative, and a moderate conservative. Brooks has described himself as a "moderate", and said in a 2017 interview that "[one] of [his] callings is to represent a certain moderate Republican Whig political philosophy." In December 2021, he wrote that he placed himself "on the rightward edge of the leftward tendency—in the more promising soil of the moderate wing of the Democratic Party." Ottawa Citizen conservative commentator David Warren has identified Brooks as a "sophisticated pundit"; one of "those Republicans who want to 'engage with' the liberal agenda". When asked what he thinks of charges that he's "not a real conservative" or "squishy", Brooks has said that "if you define conservative by support for the Republican candidate or the belief that tax cuts are the correct answer to all problems, I guess I don't fit that agenda. But I do think that I'm part of a long-standing conservative tradition that has to do with Edmund Burke ... and Alexander Hamilton." In fact, Brooks read Burke's work while he was an undergraduate at the University of Chicago and "completely despised it", but "gradually over the next five to seven years ... came to agree with him". Brooks claims that "my visceral hatred was because he touched something I didn't like or know about myself." In September 2012, Brooks talked about being criticized from the conservative side, saying, "If it's from a loon, I don't mind it. I get a kick out of it. If it's Michelle Malkin attacking, I don't mind it." With respect to whether he was "the liberals' favorite conservative" Brooks said he "didn't care", stating: "I don't mind liberals praising me, but when it's the really partisan liberals, you get an avalanche of love, it's like uhhh, I gotta rethink this."

Brooks describes himself as beginning as a liberal before, as he put it, "coming to my senses." He recounts that a turning point in his thinking came while he was still an undergraduate, when he was selected to present the socialist point of view during a televised debate with Nobel laureate free-market economist Milton Friedman. As Brooks describes it, "[It] was essentially me making a point, and he making a two-sentence rebuttal which totally devastated my point. ... That didn't immediately turn me into a conservative, but..."

Before the 2003 invasion of Iraq, Brooks argued forcefully for American military intervention, echoing the belief of commentators and political figures that American and British forces would be welcomed as liberators. In 2005, Brooks wrote what columnist Jonathan Chait described as "a witheringly condescending" column portraying Senator Harry Reid as an "unhinged conspiracy theorist because he accused the [George W. Bush] administration of falsifying its Iraq intelligence." By 2008, five years into the war, Brooks maintained that the decision to go to war was correct, but that Secretary of Defense Donald Rumsfeld had botched U.S. war efforts. In 2015, Brooks wrote that "[f]rom the current vantage point, the decision to go to war was a clear misjudgment" made in 2003 by President George W. Bush and the majority of Americans who supported the war, including Brooks himself. Brooks wrote "many of us thought that, by taking down Saddam Hussein, we could end another evil empire, and gradually open up human development in Iraq and the Arab world. Has that happened? In 2004, I would have said yes. In 2006, I would have said no. In 2015, I say yes and no, but mostly no." Citing the Robb-Silberman report, Brooks rejected as a "fable" the idea that "intelligence about Iraqi weapons of mass destruction was all cooked by political pressure, that there was a big political conspiracy to lie us into war." Instead, Brooks viewed the war as a product of faulty intelligence, writing that "[t]he Iraq war error reminds us of the need for epistemological modesty."

His dismissal of the conviction of Scooter Libby as being "a farce" and having "no significance" was derided by political blogger Andrew Sullivan.

On August 10, 2006, Brooks wrote a column for The New York Times titled "Party No. 3". The column imagined a moderate McCain-Lieberman Party in opposition to both major parties, which he perceived as both polarized and beholden to special interests.

Brooks was long a supporter of John McCain; however, he disliked McCain's 2008 running mate, Sarah Palin, calling her a "cancer" on the Republican Party, and citing her as the reason he voted for Obama in the 2008 presidential election. He has referred to Palin as a "joke", unlikely ever to win the Republican nomination. But he later admitted during a C-SPAN interview that he had gone too far in his previous "cancer" comments about Palin, which he regretted, and simply stated he was not a fan of her values.

In a March 2007 article published in The New York Times titled "No U-Turns", Brooks explained that the Republican Party must distance itself from the minimal-government conservative principles that had arisen during the Barry Goldwater and Ronald Reagan eras. He claims that these core concepts had served their purposes and should no longer be embraced by Republicans in order to win elections. Alex Pareene commented that Brooks "has been trying for so long to imagine a sensible Republican Party into existence that he can't still think it's going to happen soon."

Brooks has frequently expressed admiration for President Barack Obama. In an August 2009, profile of Brooks, The New Republic describes his first encounter with Obama, in the spring of 2005: "Usually when I talk to senators, while they may know a policy area better than me (sic), they generally don't know political philosophy better than me (sic). I got the sense he knew both better than me (sic). ... I remember distinctly an image of – we were sitting on his couches, and I was looking at his pant leg and his perfectly creased pant, and I'm thinking, (a) he's going to be president and (b) he'll be a very good president." Brooks appreciates that Obama thinks "like a writer", explaining, "He's a very writerly personality, a little aloof, exasperated. He's calm. He's not addicted to people." Two days after Obama's second autobiography, The Audacity of Hope, hit bookstores, Brooks published a column in The New York Times, titled "Run, Barack, Run", urging the Chicago politician to run for president. However, in December 2011, during a C-SPAN interview, Brooks expressed a more tempered opinion of Obama's presidency, giving Obama only a "B−", and saying that Obama's chances of re-election would be less than 50–50 if elections were held at that time. He stated, "I don't think he's integrated himself with people in Washington as much as he should have." However, in a February 2016 New York Times op-ed, Brooks admitted that he missed Obama during the 2016 primary season, admiring the president's "integrity" and "humanity", among other characteristics.

In writing for The New York Times in January 2010, Brooks described Israel as "an astonishing success story". He wrote that "Jews are a famously accomplished group," who, because they were "forced to give up farming in the Middle Ages ... have been living off their wits ever since". In Brooks' view, "Israel's technological success is the fruition of the Zionist dream. The country was not founded so stray settlers could sit among thousands of angry Palestinians in Hebron. It was founded so Jews would have a safe place to come together and create things for the world."

In 2015, Brooks issued his commentary on poverty reform in the United States. His op-ed in The New York Times  titled "The Nature of Poverty" specifically followed the social uproar caused by the death of Freddie Gray, and concluded that federal spending is not the issue impeding the progress of poverty reforms, but rather that the impediments to upward mobility are "matters of social psychology". When discussing Gray in particular, Brooks claimed that Gray as a young man was "not on the path to upward mobility".

In regard to the 2016 election, Brooks spoke in support of Hillary Clinton, applauding her ability to be "competent" and "normal" in comparison to her Republican counterpart, Donald Trump. In addition, Brooks noted that he believed Clinton would eventually be victorious in the election, as he foresaw that the general American public would become "sick of" Trump.

When discussing the political emergence of Trump, Brooks has been strong in his critiques of the candidate, most notably by authoring a New York Times op-ed he titled "No, Not Trump, Not Ever". In this piece, Brooks attacked Trump by arguing he is "epically unprepared to be president" and by pointing out Trump's "steady obliviousness to accuracy".

On the August 9, 2019 episode of the PBS NewsHour, Brooks suggested Trump may be a sociopath.

Social views
Brooks opposes what he sees as self-destructive behavior, such as the prevalence of teenage sex and divorce. His view is that "sex is more explicit everywhere barring real life. As the entertainment media have become more sex-saturated, American teenagers have become more sexually abstemious" by "waiting longer to have sex ... [and] having fewer partners". He sees the culture war as nearly over, because "today's young people ... seem happy with the frankness of the left and the wholesomeness of the right." As a result, he is optimistic about the United States' social stability, which he considers to be "in the middle of an amazing moment of improvement and repair".

As early as 2003, Brooks wrote favorably of same-sex marriage, pointing out that marriage is a traditional conservative value. Rather than opposing it, he wrote: "We should insist on gay marriage. We should regard it as scandalous that two people could claim to love each other and not want to sanctify their love with marriage and fidelity ... It's going to be up to conservatives to make the important, moral case for marriage, including gay marriage."

In 2020, Brooks wrote in The Atlantic, under the headline "The Nuclear Family Was a Mistake", that "recent signs suggest at least the possibility that a new family paradigm is emerging," suggesting that in the place of the "collapsed" nuclear one the "extended" family emerges, with "multigenerational living arrangements" that stretch even "across kinship lines." Brooks had already started in 2017 a project called "Weave", in order, as he described it, to "support and draw attention to people and organizations around the country who are building community" and to "repair [America]'s social fabric, which is badly frayed by distrust, division and exclusion."

Brooks also takes a moderate position on abortion, which he thinks should be legal, but with parental consent for minors, during the first four or five months, and illegal afterward, except in extremely rare circumstances.

He has expressed opposition to the legalization of marijuana, stating that use of the drug causes immoral behavior. Brooks relates that he smoked it in his youth but quit after a humiliating incident: Brooks smoked marijuana during lunch hour at school and felt embarrassed during a class presentation that afternoon in which he says he was incapable of intelligible speech.

Criticisms

Critics have claimed that Brooks' writings on sociology promote stereotypes and present false claims as factual. In 2004, Sasha Issenberg, writing for Philadelphia magazine, fact-checked Bobos in Paradise, arguing that many of its comments about middle America were misleading or the exact reverse of the truth. He reported Brooks as insisting that the book was not intended to be factual but to report his impressions of what he believed an area to be like: "He laughed ... '[The book was] partially tongue-in-cheek'...I went through some of the other instances where he made declarations that appeared insupportable. He accused me of being 'too pedantic,' of 'taking all of this too literally,' of 'taking a joke and distorting it.' 'That's totally unethical', he said." Brooks later said the article made him feel that "I suck...I can't remember what I said but my mother told me I was extremely stupid." In 2015, an opinion piece by David Zweig published in Salon claimed that Brooks had gotten "nearly every detail" wrong about a poll of high-school students.

Michael Kinsley argued that Brooks was guilty of "fearless generalizing ... Brooks does not let the sociology get in the way of the shtick, and he wields a mean shoehorn when he needs the theory to fit the joke". Writing for Gawker, which consistently criticized Brooks' work, opinion writer Tom Scocca argued that Brooks does not use facts and statistics to support his policy positions, noting "possibly that is because he perceives facts and statistics as an opportunity for dishonest people to work mischief". Furthermore, Annie Lowrey, in writing for the New York magazine, criticized Brooks' statistical methods when arguing his stance on political reform, claiming he used "some very tricksy, misleading math". Additionally, Sean Illing of Slate criticized the same article from Brooks, claiming he argued his point by framing his sources' arguments out of context and routinely making bold "half-right" assumptions regarding the controversial issue of poverty reform.

In 2016, James Taranto criticized Brooks' analysis of the U.S. Supreme Court case Dretke v. Haley, arguing that "Brooks's treatment of this case is either deliberately deceptive or recklessly ignorant". Law professor Ann Althouse also argued that Brooks "distorts rather grotesquely" the case in question. Brooks was previously criticized by Lyle Denniston with regard to another case, arguing that he "scrambled the actual significance of what the Supreme Court has done".

In 2018, Brooks wrote an article in The New York Times about the generation gap between older and younger Democrats, in which he attributed young Democrats' radicalism to "the cultural Marxism that is now the lingua franca in the elite academy." Brooks was criticized by journalist Ari Paul, writing for progressive media watchdog Fairness & Accuracy in Reporting (FAIR), who claimed that Brooks "rebrands cultural Marxism as mere political correctness, giving the Nazi-inspired phrase legitimacy for the American right. It is dropped in or quoted in other stories—some of them lighthearted, like the fashion cues of the alt-right—without describing how fringe this notion is. It's akin to letting conspiracy theories about chem trails or vaccines get unearned space in mainstream press." Ari Paul and Spencer Sunshine, an associate fellow at the Political Research Associates, argued that failure to highlight the nature of the Cultural Marxist conspiracy theory "has bitter consequences. 'It is legitimizing the use of that framework, and therefore it's coded antisemitism."

Legacy

Sidney Awards
In 2004 Brooks created an award to honor the best political and cultural journalism of the year. Named for philosopher Sidney Hook and originally called "The Hookies", the honor was renamed "The Sidney Awards" in 2005. The awards are presented each December.

Doctor of Humane Letters
Sacred Heart University bestowed an honorary degree at its annual Academic Convocation on its Fairfield campus on Wednesday, February 9, 2022. Brooks received a Doctor of Humane Letters, honoris causa.

Personal life
Brooks met his first wife, Jane Hughes, while they were students at the University of Chicago. She converted to Judaism and changed her given name to Sarah. In November 2013, they divorced. In 2017, Brooks married his former research assistant, writer Anne Snyder.

According to The Jewish Journal of Greater Los Angeles, in a September 2014 interview with the Israeli newspaper Haaretz, Brooks said that his oldest son serves in the Israel Defense Forces.

In an interview with Francis Collins published on May 23, 2022, Brooks said he became a Christian in 2013 or 2014.

Select bibliography
 Editor, Backward and Upward: The New Conservative Writing (Vintage, 1996) 0-6797-6654-5
 Bobos in Paradise: The New Upper Class and How They Got There (2000) 
 On Paradise Drive: How We Live Now (And Always Have) in the Future Tense (2004) 
 The Social Animal: The Hidden Sources of Love, Character, and Achievement (2011) 
 The Road to Character (Random House, 2015) 
 The Second Mountain: The Quest for a Moral Life (Random House, 2019)

See also
 Co-commentator on NPR: E. J. Dionne.
 Co-commentator on the PBS Newshour: Jonathan Capehart

References

External links

 
 
 
 
 The lies our culture tells about what matters - a better way to live - TED Talk
 Column archive at The New York Times
 Column archive at The Atlantic
 Column archive at The Weekly Standard
 David Brooks on The Emily Rooney Show on WGBH Radio
 Video: David Brooks discusses The Social Animal: The Hidden Sources of Love, Character, and Achievement on March 17, 2011, on Forum Network.

1961 births
Living people
20th-century American Jews
20th-century American journalists
20th-century American male writers
20th-century American non-fiction writers
20th-century Canadian male writers
21st-century American Jews
21st-century American journalists
21st-century American male writers
21st-century American non-fiction writers
21st-century Canadian male writers
21st-century Christians
American Christian Zionists
American columnists
American male journalists
American male non-fiction writers
American political commentators
American political journalists
American political writers
American social commentators
The Atlantic (magazine) people
Converts to Christianity from Judaism
Jewish American journalists
Jewish American writers
Jewish Canadian writers
Maryland Republicans
The New York Times columnists
The New York Times writers
New America (organization)
Newsweek people
PBS people
People from Bethesda, Maryland
People from Radnor Township, Pennsylvania
Radical centrist writers
University of Chicago alumni
The Wall Street Journal people
The Washington Times people
The Weekly Standard people
Writers from Maryland
Writers from Toronto